The following is a list of subcamps of the Natzweiler-Struthof complex of Nazi concentration camps, and work kommandos from the main camp.

These subordinated camps were located on both sides of the German-French border.  There were about 50 subcamps in the Natzweiler-Struthof camp system, located in Alsace and Lorraine as well as in the adjacent German provinces of Baden and Württemberg. By the fall of 1944, there were about 7,000 prisoners in the main camp and more than 20,000 in subcamps.

 Asbach, today part of Obrigheim
 Auerbach, today part of Bensheim
 Bad Rappenau
 Baden-Baden
 Balingen
 Bernhausen
 Binau, seat of administration for subcamps in the area of Neckarelz, not a Concentration Camp
 Bisingen
 Bruttig-Treis (also called Treis-Bruttig), today Treis-Karden and Bruttig-Fankel, near Cochem
 Calw
 Cernay, Haut-Rhin
 Colmar
 Darmstadt
 Daudenzell, today part of Aglasterhausen
 Dautmergen
 Echterdingen
 Ellwangen
 Erzingen, today part of Balingen
 Frankfurt/Main, located within the Adler factory
 Frommern, today part of Balingen
 Geisenheim
 Geislingen an der Steige
 Fort Goeben within the city of Metz
 Gross-Sachsenheim
 Guttenbach, today part of Neckargerach, part of the administration moved into the town hall after they abandoned the main camp, not a Concentration Camp
 Hailfingen-Tailfingen
 Haslach
 Heilbronn
 Heppenheim
 Hessenthal, today part of Schwäbisch Hall
 Iffezheim
 Kaisheim
 Kochendorf
 Leonberg, in the Engelberg Tunnel
 Mosbach
 Neckarbischofsheim
 Neckarelz I and II
 Neckargerach
 Neckargartach, today part of Heilbronn
 Neunkirchen
 Oberehnheim, today Obernai
 Oberschefflenz, today part of Schefflenz
 Obrigheim
 Offenburg
 Peltre
 Plattenwald, today part of Bad Friedrichshall
 Rothau
 Saint-Die
 Sainte Marie aux Mines
 Sandhofen
 Schirmeck
 Schömberg
 Schörzingen, today part of Schömberg
 Schwäbisch Hall
 Schwarzacher Hof, today part of Schwarzach
 Spaichingen
 Thil
 Unterriexingen, today part of Markgröningen 
 Wiesengrund at Vaihingen an der Enz
 Walldorf, today part of Mörfelden-Walldorf
 Wasseralfingen, today part of Aalen
 Weckrieden, today part of Schwäbisch Hall
 Wesserling, today Husseren-Wesserling
 Zuffenhausen

References

External links
Listing at Jewish virtual library based on "Le livre des Camps" by Ludo Van Eck (1979).

See also
List of Nazi-German concentration camps

 
Natzweiler-Struthof
Nazi concentration camps in France